The Northern Dancer Turf Stakes is a Canadian Thoroughbred horse race held annually at Woodbine Racetrack in Toronto, Ontario in mid-September. A Grade I event with a current purse of Can$300,000, it is run at a distance of  miles on Woodbine's E. P. Taylor turf course.

Inaugurated as the Niagara Handicap, it was first raced on dirt at the Fort Erie Racetrack. In 1957 the race was changed to run on turf and was moved to the Woodbine Racetrack in 1985 where for 1986 only, it was run on dirt. The race became part of the Breeders' Cup program and the name was amended to the Niagara Breeders' Cup Handicap. In 2006, the event was renamed to honour Canada's most famous racehorse, Northern Dancer.

Over the years, the race has been run at various distances:
  miles : 1953-1956 
   miles : 1957-1975
   miles : 1990-1994 
  miles : 1976-1989, 1995 to present

Records
Speed Record:
 2:25.87 - Strut the Stage (2004) at the current distance of  miles

Most wins:
 2 - Marshall Ney II (1957, 1958) 
 2 - Strut the Stage (2003, 2004)
 2 - Wigmore Hall (2011, 2012)
 2 - Johnny Bear (2017, 2018)

Most wins by an owner:
 8 - Sam-Son Farm (1991, 1996, 1997, 1998, 2002, 2003, 2004, 2020)
 5 - Gardiner Farm (1967, 1968, 1970, 1974, 1976)

Most wins by a jockey:
 4 - Todd Kabel (2002, 2003, 2004, 2006)
 3 - Sandy Hawley (1970, 1996, 1997)

Most wins by a Trainer:
 6 - Lou Cavalaris, Jr. (1966, 1967, 1968, 1970, 1974, 1976)
 6 - Mark Frostad (1996, 1997, 1998, 2002, 2003, 2004)

Winners since 1986

Earlier winners 

 1985 - Sondrio
 1984 - Cost Control
 1983 - Norwick
 1982 - Lord Elgin
 1981 - Bridle Path
 1980 - Morold
 1979 - Dom Alaric
 1978 - Tuxedo Mac
 1977 - Momigi
 1976 - Don Lorenzo
 1975 - Yvetot
 1974 - Carney's Point
 1973 - Fun Co K
 1972 - Belle Geste
 1971 - One For All
 1970 - Panpiper
 1969 - Hammer Kopf
 1968 - The Knack ll
 1967 - Canadel‡
 1966 - Orbiter
 1965 - Quick Pitch
 1964 - Will I Rule
 1963 - Puss n Boots
 1962 - Our Jeep
 1961 - Harmonizing
 1960 - Moony
 1959 - Grey Monarch
 1958 - Marshall Ney II
 1957 - Marshall Ney II
 1956 - Captor
 1955 - Jimminy Baxter
 1954 - Pheasant Boy
 1953 - Scene One

 † In 2009, Marsh Side finished first but was disqualified and set back to fourth.  On appeal, the original order of finish was restored on May 26, 2010.
 ‡ In 1967, Carteret finished first but was disqualified and set back to last.

See also
 List of Canadian flat horse races

References

Turf races in Canada
Grade 1 stakes races in Canada
Open middle distance horse races
Woodbine Racetrack
Recurring sporting events established in 1953
1953 establishments in Ontario